Sidi Lakhdar is a town and commune in Mostaganem Province, Algeria, about 300 km west of the capital, Algiers. It is the capital of Sidi Lakhdar District. According to the 1998 census, it has a population of 30,950. Under French colonial rule, the town was known as Lapasset. It changed its name in 1962.

References

Communes of Mostaganem Province